The Atlas Group,, is a Pakistani conglomerate company based in Karachi, Pakistan and founded in 1962.
 
It has its operations in power generation, engineering, financial services and trading fields.

As of 2016, Atlas Powergen had joint venture agreements with Siemens of Germany and SEPCO3 of China to set up power plants in Pakistan.

Yusuf H. Shirazi was the Chairman of Atlas Group. He was also the founder member of Karachi Stock Exchange, Lahore Stock Exchange and International Chamber of Commerce and Industry. Mr Yousaf Shirazi died on 20 October 2019.

References

External links
 Atlas Group
 

Conglomerate companies of Pakistan
Conglomerate companies established in 1962
1962 establishments in Pakistan
Companies based in Karachi
Pakistani companies established in 1962